Lochmaeocles is a genus of longhorn beetles of the subfamily Lamiinae, containing the following species:

 Lochmaeocles alboplagiatus Dillon & Dillon, 1946
 Lochmaeocles basalis Dillon & Dillon, 1946
 Lochmaeocles batesi (Aurivillius, 1923)
 Lochmaeocles callidryas (Bates, 1865)
 Lochmaeocles confertus (Aurivillius, 1923)
 Lochmaeocles congener (Thomson, 1868)
 Lochmaeocles consobrinus Dillon & Dillon, 1946
 Lochmaeocles cornuticeps Schaeffer, 1906
 Lochmaeocles cretatus Chemsak & Linsley, 1986
 Lochmaeocles fasciatus (Lucas in Laporte, 1857)
 Lochmaeocles grisescens Noguera & Chemsak, 1993
 Lochmaeocles hondurensis Dillon & Dillon, 1946
 Lochmaeocles laticinctus Dillon & Dillon, 1946
 Lochmaeocles leuripennis Martins & Galileo, 1995
 Lochmaeocles marmoratus Casey, 1913
 Lochmaeocles nigritarsus Chemsak & Linsley, 1986
 Lochmaeocles obliquatus Dillon & Dillon, 1946
 Lochmaeocles pseudovestitus Chemsak & Linsley, 1988
 Lochmaeocles pulcher Dillon & Dillon, 1946
 Lochmaeocles salvadorensis (Franz, 1954)
 Lochmaeocles sladeni (Gahan, 1903)
 Lochmaeocles sparsus (Bates, 1880)
 Lochmaeocles tessellatus (Thomson, 1868)
 Lochmaeocles vestitus (Bates, 1885)
 Lochmaeocles zonatus Dillon & Dillon, 1946

References

 
Onciderini